The Campito Formation is a geologic formation in Nevada. It preserves fossils dating back to the Cambrian period.

See also

 List of fossiliferous stratigraphic units in Nevada
 Paleontology in Nevada

References

Cambrian geology of Nevada
Cambrian California
Cambrian southern paleotropical deposits
Cambrian northern paleotropical deposits